Laurens–Marathon Community School District is a rural public school district headquartered in Laurens, Iowa, also serving Marathon. The district occupies sections of Buena Vista, Clay, Palo Alto, and Pocahontas counties.

History
It formed on July 1, 1976, by the merger of the Laurens Community School District and the Marathon Community School District.

On July 1, 2010, the South Clay Community School District was dissolved, and Laurens–Marathon received portions of the district.

In 2014, the South Central Calhoun Community School District, a district not contiguous with Laurens–Marathon, entered a superintendent-sharing agreement. The shared superintendent was Jeff Kruse.

The district began partial-day sharing, in which students from one district went to another district for some classes, with the Pocahontas Community School District around 2015.

Kruse was scheduled to leave at the end of the 2016–17 school year. Scott Williamson became the new superintendent in July 2017. That year, the L-M and Pocahontas districts began whole grade-sharing, in which one district sent its children to another district for certain grade levels. L-M had multiple classes it was required to have in order to maintain high school grades, but insufficient numbers of students were enrolled in them. As a result, Laurens–Marathon sent its high school students to Pocahontas high school. Around that time period, Laurens–Marathon elementary school students had, as part of a preliminary indication, increased test scores.

Laurens–Marathon is notable for its severe mismanagement of funds, particularly pertaining to the fine arts.  Additionally, Laurens–Marathon middle school students were once given textbooks so old that they had to write in the 27th Amendment to the Constitution.

Schools

The district operates two schools in a single facility in Laurens:
 Laurens–Marathon Elementary School
 Laurens–Marathon Middle School

The current  by  gymnasium opened in September 1998. The previous  by  gymnasium, built in the early 1940s, was called "The Barn".

See also
List of school districts in Iowa

References

External links
 

School districts in Iowa
Education in Buena Vista County, Iowa
Education in Clay County, Iowa
Education in Palo Alto County, Iowa
Education in Pocahontas County, Iowa
1976 establishments in Iowa
School districts established in 1976